During the 1997–98 English football season, Bradford City A.F.C. competed in the Football League First Division.

Season summary
In the 1997–98 season, Bradford started well with 13 points from a possible 15 which saw the Bantams top of the table after five games, but results declined and chairman Geoffrey Richmond sacked Kamara on 6 January, three days after a 2–0 FA Cup defeat to Manchester City.

Richmond turned to Jewell, who was by now Kamara's assistant, and he won his first game 2–1 to Stockport County. In his 21 games in charge, Jewell won six games and drew five to guide Bradford to 13th, their highest position since Jewell had joined the club. He was rewarded with a permanent contract when others expected Richmond to turn to a big name.

Final league table

Results
Bradford City's score comes first

Legend

Football League First Division

FA Cup

League Cup

Squad

References

Bradford City A.F.C. seasons
Bradford City